In broadcast programming, counterprogramming is the practice of offering television programs to attract an audience from another television station airing a major event. It is also referred when programmers offer something different from the rival's program as an alternative, to increase the audience size.

United States
The main events counterprogrammed in the United States are the Super Bowl, the Oscars, and the Olympic Games.

Super Bowl

The Super Bowl, being among the most watched sports television events in the United States, became a notable target of counterprogramming during the 1990s due to its previous halftime shows; which critics felt were dated and not representative of modern pop culture. During Super Bowl XXVI, Fox aired a live, football-themed episode of In Living Color against halftime (featuring an onscreen countdown clock so fans would know when to switch back to the game); the special drew 22 million viewers; Nielsen estimated that CBS lost 10 ratings points during halftime as a result of the special.

The success of the special alarmed the National Football League, who took steps to increase interest and viewership of the halftime show by inviting major pop musicians to perform, beginning with Michael Jackson at Super Bowl XXVII. This pattern continued until 2005, when an incident at Super Bowl XXXVIII's halftime show where Justin Timberlake exposed one of Janet Jackson's breasts, led to a string of halftime shows with a single, headlining classic rock act (such as the Rolling Stones, Prince, and Bruce Springsteen) in an effort to prevent a repeat of the "wardrobe malfunction" (since Super Bowl XLV, the NFL has returned to inviting pop artists to play halftime). Despite Michael Jackson's performance helping to increase interest in subsequent halftime shows, Fox's success inspired imitators, and influenced other specials such as Animal Planet's annual Puppy Bowl (featuring dogs playing in a model football stadium), and the Lingerie Bowl, a series of pay-per-view broadcasts of all-female football games played in lingerieproving popular enough to be spun off into its own Lingerie Football League.

Under an unsaid gentlemen's agreement, all four major networks (including CBS, Fox, and NBC, who also alternate airing the Super Bowl on a yearly cycle; ESPN is under the same ownership as ABC) will typically not schedule any new programming (nor air counterprogramming) on the night of the Super Bowl. Fox provided an exception in 2010 when it aired two new episodes of 'Til Death against Super Bowl XLIV; however, the network had been in the process of burning off the low-rated sitcom in unusual timeslots so its distributor would have enough episodes to syndicate it. 

As to preempt the possibility that the 2022 Winter Olympics would counterprogram the game, CBS agreed to swap Super Bowl LVI—which, for the first time, was scheduled during an ongoing Olympic Games—to NBC for Super Bowl LV, so that both events were aired by the same network. Furthermore, the structure of the rotation under the NFL's next round of television contracts (which expands it to all four major networks) gives NBC rights to the game in future Winter Olympic years.

NFL Network also suspends programming during the game in favor of Super Bowl Game Center, a static screen with the game's radio broadcast and a live scoreboard.

Academy Awards
In 2007, the NASCAR Sprint Cup Series' Auto Club 500 at Auto Club Speedway in Fontana, California, was held on the same day as the 79th Academy Awards, although it was held during the early afternoon with a 1:00 p.m. PT (4:00 p.m. ET) start. The 2008 Auto Club 500 was plagued by rain delays and unintentionally aired against a portion of the 80th Academy Awards; its start time was pushed back to around 3:00 p.m. PT (6:00 p.m. ET), while the race itself was halted again at around 6:00 p.m. PT (9:00 p.m. ET). In 2009, the race was intentionally scheduled with a 3:00 p.m. PT start, which would overlap into the telecast of the 81st Academy Awards. Fox Sports' senior vice president of programming and research Bill Wanger supported the idea, believing that NASCAR races "[could] hold their own against any competition", arguing that the Oscars and the race appealed primarily to female and male audiences respectively. For the 2010 season, the race was moved to a 12:00 p.m. PT (3:00 p.m. ET) start due to standardized start times for all races introduced that season.

For a number of years, the championship game of the NCAA men's basketball tournament aired on the day of the Academy Awards ceremony, leading into primetime.  The 1976 NCAA Final Four, broadcast on NBC, ended with the Indiana Hoosiers defeating the Michigan Wolverines, 86–68; the game ended just as the Best Film Editing Oscar was about to the announced.  That year's Academy Awards ceremony acknowledged its competition when the final score of the game was announced before Verna Fields was announced as the winner of the award.  By the time CBS had taken over broadcasting the NCAA Final Four, the Academy Awards ceremony had by now taken place the week before the Final Four, and has since moved well away into mid or late February (except during Winter Olympic years) due to ABC's want to have the awards take place during the February sweeps period, along with the general consolidation of the film awards season into a shorter period.

The 2012 NBA All-Star Game was played opposite the 84th Academy Awards. The presentation drew an estimated 39.3 million viewers, a 4% increase over the previous year. Conversely, viewership for the All Star Game on TNT measured at 7.1 million, a 22% decline from last year's 9.1 million.

The Alliance of American Football scheduled one of its contests opposite the 91st Academy Awards in 2019. The game drew 515,000 viewers, a bump of approximately 20% from the previous week's and following week's matchup on the same network, NFL Network.

College football
The move is harder in the sport, especially with ESPN games competing against CBS games.  Because of a CBS contract with the Southeastern Conference that gives the conference exclusivity at the 3:30 p.m. ET slot, and ESPN's games being regional (parts of the country may receive games from different conferences, with ABC now airing primarily the Atlantic Coast Conference and most Notre Dame away games), and even a Fox game with one of their three conferences, college football schedules are intentionally made flexible in order to allow networks to choose the best game when possible. The SEC opened their exclusivity up slightly in the 2014 for ESPN with the launch of their SEC Network with the conference, which now allows that ESPN to air up to two SEC games (one on the main SEC Network feed, with a lower-tier matchup carried by the SEC Network's alternate feed), though CBS retains first choice for their preferred game.

Professional wrestling 
In 1995, the professional wrestling promotion World Championship Wrestling (WCW) began to schedule a live, weekly show on TNT, Monday Nitro, to compete directly with the rival WWF's (now WWE) Raw on USA Network (which, at the time, did not always broadcast live), resulting in an intense rivalry dubbed the "Monday Night Wars". Aided by WCW's popular New World Order (nWo) angle with Hulk Hogan, Nitro regularly beat Raw in viewership for 84 consecutive weeks.

In 1997, the WWF began to shift its programming in a mature direction dubbed the "Attitude Era" to compete with WCW. By April 1998, bolstered by the popularity of performers such as Stone Cold Steve Austin, and his in-universe feuds with WWF owner Vince McMahon, Raw began to overtake Nitro in viewership for the first time since 1996.

As the show only aired live on occasion at the time, WCW commentators occasionally discussed Raw spoilers on-air as a ploy to keep viewers from tuning away. This tactic infamously backfired during its January 4, 1999, episode, when a spoiler that Mick Foley (who previously performed on WCW as Cactus Jack, and presently performed in the WWF as Mankind) would win the WWF Championship had the opposite effect, causing Nitro to lose around 600,000 viewers to the final hour of Raw. The Nitro main event (featuring Hulk Hogan defeating Kevin Nash for the WCW World Heavyweight Championship) was also marred by its unusual build-up and controversial finish—dubbed the "Fingerpoke of Doom". Critics credited the episode's events as one of several missteps that led towards WCW's eventual demise, and the sale of its assets to WWF.

For eight weeks in 2010, TNA Impact! aired on Mondays to rival Raw. This started on January 4, 2010, during which WWE staged the return of Bret Hart, his first WWE appearance in over 12 years. TNA dropped two-thirds of viewers during this time, before TNA converted back to Thursday, with president Dixie Carter saying: “Our fans made it clear that they preferred the Thursday night time period. By moving to Thursdays, this is a win/win opportunity for both TNA and the fans. We are looking forward to delivering what the fans are asking for.”

A renewed wrestling rivalry between TNT and USA emerged in 2019, between WWE and the new promotion All Elite Wrestling (AEW) — which has been seen as the first major promotion since WCW to compete financially with WWE. TNT began to air AEW's first weekly program, Dynamite, on Wednesday nights beginning on October 2, 2019. On August 2, WWE announced that it would expand WWE NXT—a popular WWE Network program that focuses on a developmental brand of the same name—to a two-hour format on USA Network beginning the same night (soft-launching on September 18 with only the first hour airing on USA, as lead-ins for the final episodes of Suits). The decision was seen as a move to counterprogram the upstart AEW, and also came alongside USA losing WWE's second flagship program SmackDown to Fox the same month. Both AEW and NXT held two-week events on their July 1 and 8, 2020 episodes, with AEW holding Fyter Fest (which had originally been planned as a PPV), and NXT holding The Great American Bash (a former pay-per-view brand originating from WCW). After regularly losing in the ratings to Dynamite, on April 13, 2021, WWE moved NXT to Tuesday nights.

The October 15, 2021, episode of SmackDown (which was slated to feature the semi-finals of the King of the Ring and Queen's Crown tournaments) was pre-empted to FS1 due to Fox coverage of the 2021 American League Championship Series. AEW's second weekly show on TNT, Rampage (which was scheduled for a live episode with matches featuring Chris Jericho, CM Punk, and Junior dos Santos among others), is usually scheduled to air at 10:00 p.m. ET as to not conflict with the two-hour SmackDown; WWE announced that SmackDown would be extended with an extra, commercial-free half hour, featuring a match between Becky Lynch and Sasha Banks—countering the first half-hour of Rampage. In response, AEW announced that it would stream a pre-show on YouTube prior to Rampage with a match between Bryan Danielson and Minoru Suzuki. After WWE announced that an encore presentation of SmackDown would immediately follow the live airing, AEW then announced that its opening match between CM Punk and Matt Sydal would also air commercial-free. In key demographic viewership, Rampage drew 328,000 viewers, beating the extension of SmackDown by 43,000.

Other
When KCPQ signed back on in November 1980, it aired, mostly uncut, the film The Deer Hunter to counter the major networks, who were telecasting the 1980 presidential election results.

NBC, the long-time broadcaster of the Macy's Fourth of July fireworks in New York City, has historically aired an encore presentation of the special at 10:00 p.m. ET/PT, immediately following its live broadcast. The Boston Pops Orchestra's own concert and fireworks special on CBS aired live at the same time as the NBC encore. While NBC claimed that this was for budgetary reasons, Boston Pops executive producer David G. Mugar believed that NBC had done so to intentionally pull viewers away from the Boston Pops. After ratings fell by 1 million viewers for 2012, CBS ended its national broadcasts of the event in 2013; the concert was still aired in full, as before, by its Boston station WBZ-TV. The national broadcast was revived on CBS for 2016 with an expanded two-hour format, before moving to Bloomberg Television in 2017 due to Bloomberg's new sponsorship of the event.

On the day of Donald Trump's inauguration as president of the United States, Comedy Central broadcast an all-day marathon of the 20th season of South Park — which had featured an ongoing storyline where Mr. Garrison is elected president in a parody of Trump and his campaign.

During the 2018 Winter Olympics, which were broadcast by NBC, other networks generally placed their main lineups of scripted programming on hiatus, barring The CW for selected series. However, the networks continued to air most of their unscripted reality programs as an alternative, with ABC airing The Bachelor and Shark Tank, and CBS airing The Amazing Race. ABC and CBS also scheduled spin-offs of their other signature reality franchises to specifically compete against the Olympics, including The Bachelor Winter Games (which featured alumni of The Bachelor and The Bachelorette competing in winter sports challenges), and the first U.S. season of Celebrity Big Brother—which aired its season finale against the closing ceremony. CBS would order a second season of Celebrity Big Brother to air in 2019, followed by a third in 2022 to air against the 2022 Winter Olympics.

ABC had planned a summer-themed follow-up to The Bachelor Winter Games to air in August 2020 against the 2020 Summer Olympics, but production was cancelled due to the COVID-19 pandemic (which led said Games to be postponed to 2021).

United Kingdom
In the United Kingdom, Ofcom can punish broadcasters who deliberately counterprogram another broadcaster for the intent of damaging the other broadcaster's ratings. In 2000, the coincidental scheduling of the first million-pound winner on ITV's Who Wants to Be a Millionaire? opposite the final episode of One Foot in the Grave on BBC One drew accusations of counterprogramming; the Independent Television Commission (ITC), after investigating the matter, exonerated ITV of any wrongdoing. 

By contrast, an attempt by ITV to counterprogram the revival of the BBC's Doctor Who with the game show Celebrity Wrestling was unsuccessful, to the point that ITV elected to burn off the series in a lower-profile Sunday timeslot.

See also
List of Super Bowl halftime counterprogramming

References

Television terminology